Wesley John Byrne (born 9 February 1977 in Dublin, Ireland) was an Irish footballer who played as a full back for Darlington in The Football League and Longford Town in the League of Ireland. Wesley enjoyed a successful spell with Longford Town, helping them gain promotion to the Premier Division and leading them to the 2001 FAI Cup Final.

Career statistics
Source:

External links

References

1977 births
Living people
Republic of Ireland association footballers
Association football defenders
Middlesbrough F.C. players
Darlington F.C. players
Gateshead F.C. players
Stoke City F.C. players
Longford Town F.C. players
Dublin City F.C. players
English Football League players
National League (English football) players
Belvedere F.C. players
Republic of Ireland youth international footballers